Rosa Brook is a town in the South West region of Western Australia. It is located 288 km south of Perth and the closest populated town is Margaret River. Rosa Brook has a community hall and a local store which was established in 1932 by the Darnell family. The region is best known for farming beef and lamb in addition to harvesting wine and olives.

References 

Towns in Western Australia
South West (Western Australia)